(July 2, 1886 – December 27, 1953) was an American actor, director, producer, and writer of the Silent film era. Wells was a -year old actor who earned his first credited role in the 1915  Universal short film — 

Wells worked his way up the ranks at Universal, ultimately being promoted from Assistant Director to full-time Director in 1917. In 1919, Wells worked on the Universal movie serial  — The Lion Man. After directing the first two chapters of the production, he quit his job. Wells booked passage and departed for Australia, hoping to participate in their burgeoning movie industry. In 1921, Wells hit his high water mark when he wrote, produced, and directed the Australian film — 

Wells and his wife, Agnes Vernon, returned to America in 1922. Wells partnered in a real estate brokerage firm in La Jolla, California. He briefly emerged in the publishing world when he published his novel —  in 1932.

John and Judith Wells continued to live in both California and Arizona until his wife died in 1948.  Wells would die five years later in 1953. He was  when he died.

Early years
John Wells's father, John Q. Wells, ( – 1889) was born in New York. His mother, Josephine  (1855 – 1934) was born in Chicago. Josephine and John Q  were married in Chicago on November 24, 1875.The 1880 census shows John Q Wells and Josephine living in Riverside, Illinois along with their two daughters Gracie, born in 1876, and Alice, born in 1879. The census lists John's occupation as "Real Estate." Coddington Wells was born in 1884 and John Kenneth Wells was born on July 2, 1886, in Evanston, Illinois. John Wells was one when his sister, Alice, died in 1887. Wells was  when his father died in 1889. 

The 1900 census shows 44-year-old Josephine Wells is the widowed head of Household. The family consists of Josephine, 
her -year-old son Coddington and  -year-old son John K. They have a live-in servant while continuing to reside in Riverside, Illinois. Little is known of Wells's personal life after 1900 until he appears on a Universal lot.

Career

Hollywood
It is unknown if Wells appeared in movies as an extra or in any uncredited roles before September 1915. John K. Wells first surfaced in the media with a credited role in the  " William Worthington" short film -  released on September 14, 1915. The Universal production starring Herbert Rawlinson and Anna Little. This first movie role also initiates a relationship with William Worthington, which will bear fruit in the future. This Worthington-directed project starred Herbert Rawlingson and Agnes Vernon. This film is the first time Wells appears in a movie with Agnes Vernon.  

His last supporting role is in the 1916 production  (Working title of "Bloodhounds of North,") released on May 16, 1916. This last film was another Worthington-directed film starred Herbert Rawlingson and Agnes Vernon. 

June 16, 1916, sees the release of the short film —  starring Herbert Rawlinson and Agnes Vernon. Universal promotes Wells to an assistant director and writer. He continues his relationship with the William Worthington company. In July 1917, Wells was promoted from William Worthington's assistant to the full-fledged Director.

An article in the "Motion Picture News" dated July 7, 1917, states, "Universal City has a new director in the person of Jack Wells, a former assistant of William Worthington. Mr Wells will make a number of additional releases to the series, "The Perils of the Secret Service . . ."

The August 9, 1919 issue of The Moving Picture World contained an article headlined "Mrs. Baker Selects Staff." The article states Mrs. Baker "has selected a staff of five film experts" to take to Australia to make films. Her selections included Howard Gaye as an assistant director. However, Gaye had several contractual obligations to Universal which he would have to abandon if he left. He postponed his decision until a few days before the group was to sail for Australia. He informed the American contingent he had decided to honor his universal contract. Who could replace Gayne on this short notice? 

John K. Wells was working on a Universal serial  featuring Kathleen O'Connor. He had two episodes finished and was working on the third. Wells somehow catches wind of Gayle's backing out of the Australian adventure and volunteers to replace him. John K. Wells became a last-minute replacement for Gaye, which explained Well's late application for a passport.  Wells was an upgrade over Gaye since he was an experienced director and assistant director. Besides his qualifications, the opportunity to be close to Agnus while gaining exposure to the Australian film market greatly influenced his decision. 

Given these opportunities, Wells decided to forgo contractual obligations to Universal, quit his Director's job, and set sail for Australia on September 9, 1919.

Australia
John K. Wells set sail for Sydney, Australia, and arrived on September 29, 1919. He would become involved in producing four films. The Australian adventure would be the directorial last hurrah for John Wells.

The first American contingent of film experts included Director Wilfred Lucas, his wife screenwriter Bess Meredyth Lucas,  actress Brownie Vernon and Cinematographer John Doerrer and had arrived in Sydney on September 2, 1919. These professionals were personally recruited by Snowy Baker and approved by  E. J. Carroll. They went to work immediately, beginning with Research and Location scouting. 

The Man from Kangaroo (Jan 1920)

The fruits of the Lucas contingent resulted in a trio of films. The first film was The Man from Kangaroo, released in Australia on January 24, 1920. The film featured Snowy Baker, directed by Wilfred Lucas and written by Bess Meredyth. The film's leading lady was Agnes Vernon. They list John Wells as one of the Assistant Directors and a film editor. The 73-minute feature film was produced by E. J. Carroll and Snowy Baker. The film was shot on location in Kangaroo Valley during September and October 1919. The film was a success at the box office. This was the only movie of the trio of Lucas films to survive.

The Shadow of Lightning Ridge (Apr 1920)
The second film of the American troupe was "The Shadow of Lightning Ridge," released in Australia on April 3, 1920. The feature was directed by Wilfred Lucas and written by Bess Meredyth. The film's featured leads were  Snowy Baker and Agnes Vernon. John Wells is listed as the Assistant Director. The seven-reel feature film was produced by E. J. Carroll and Snowy Baker and their production company, Carroll-Baker Australian Productions.  

Filming started in early 1920 in the bush near Sydney, and at a studio built by E.J. Carroll. The film was well received in Australia and successful at the box office. The film was released in the U.S. under the same name on September 13, 1921, by William Selig  and Aywon Film Corporation. It is considered a lost film.

The Carrolls folded their production company after completing this film. They said 

The Jackeroo of Coolabong (Oct 1920)
On October 16, 1920, Wilfred Lucas released his last Australian film. Brownie Vernon departed Australia on April 17, 1920, and John Wells was not involved in the project. During filming, E. J. Carroll clashed with Lucas over the cost of films. Wilfred Lucas and crew returned to Hollywood, arriving in San Francisco on April 5, 1920  Wells remained in Australia to work on other projects.

The Man from Snowy River (Aug 1920)
Since the Lucas collaboration had ended abruptly, Wells was searching for a project. He found an opportunity with the Australian company of Beaumont Smith's Productions. They were about to start production on a new film to be produced, directed, and written by Beaumont Smith. Smith offered Wells a chance to be a co-director, and Wells accepted. 

Beaumont Smith had purchased the rights to a poem — The Man from Snowy River by Australian bush poet Banjo Paterson. He then spent two years developing a Screenplay for a film based on the poem.  Shooting began in June 1920 in the Blue Mountains.
 The final result was the release of  The Man from Snowy River on August 28, 1920. The film would feature Australia's own  and  Stella Southern. It is considered a lost film.

Silks and Saddles (1921)

Wells wrote, directed, co-edited, and produced Silks and Saddles  The movie featured Wells's wife Brownie Vernon and  They set the film in the world of horse racing. 

Newly formed Australian company, Commonwealth Pictures, and The Carroll Brothers provided funding of £5,600 (approximately $250,000 in today's money). The film was released on March 5, 1921, and garnered good reviews. The film would eventually gross £50,000 (over two million in today's U.S. money). The film is one of the rare Australian silent movies to survive today. This film was the final production for Wells. He would never direct another film.

An item in the Billboard dated November 21, 1921, reads:

1922-1953
John Wells and his wife booked passage on the S.S. Sonoma, arriving in San Francisco, California, on March 28, 1922. 

The  incorporated in 1919. They started actively recruited talent for their new company including John K. Wells in 1922. A piece of news in the Exhibitors Trade Review dated May 6, 1922, stated:  There no record of another trip to Australia in April 1922 or any Wells movies produced for Producers Security.

Wells decided to follow in his father's footsteps. In January 1925, the "California Directory of Brokers and Salesmen" posted John K. Wells establishing a corporation — Lathrop-Wells Inc. They become a Real Estate brokerage firm headquartered in La Jolla, California with the following officials:

The 1930 census shows John Wells is living in San Diego, working as a realtor.

Writer

John Wells completed his novel  and the book was published by Brentano's in 1932. 

RKO Pictures purchased the rights to the book and decided to produce a film based on the book. Production began in mid-June 1933, and  Rafter Romance was released on September 1, 1933. This first iteration of Rafter Romance was directed by William A. Seiter with a cast consisting of Ginger Rogers, Norman Foster, and George Sidney. Four years after the release of Rafter Romance, RKO producer Merian C. Cooper decided to reissue the film. The new movie was renamed Living on Love and featured a cast of James Dunn, Whitney Bourne, and Joan Woodbury. Shooting started in August 1937, and the second iteration, directed by Lew Landers, was released on November 12, 1937.

Marriage
A news article in Billboard, dated November 19, 1921, stated he was married to Brownie Vernon. The 1930 and 1940 Censuses bear this out.  also verifies marriage. John Wells was married to Judith Vernon Wells   for 27 years. There were no children.

Deaths
The Wells lived in Phoenix, Arizona when she became ill. Because of her illness, Judith moved back to La Jolla, California, to be close to her parents. She died of heart complications on Saturday, February 21, 1948, at her parents' home. She was  years old at the time of her death. In her obituary, there is no mention of an acting career.

On Sunday, December 27, 1953, John K. Wells died of a heart attack in Glendale, California. He was  years old at the time of his death. Wells had formerly been in charge of publications for the  Church of Christ, Scientists in Arizona and currently worked as a sales representative for the Arizona radio station KTAR. There was no mention of any Hollywood connections in his obituary.
John Wells was interred in San Diego, California's Greenwood Memorial Park Mausoleum next to his wife.

Filmography

Gallery

Notes

References

Further reading

External links

The Man from Kangaroo at the National Film and Sound Archive

The Shadow of Lightning Ridge at National Film and Sound Archive
The Man from Snowy River at National Film and Sound Archive

Silks and Saddles at National Film and Sound Archive

1894 births
1960 deaths
American film directors